The 1978–79 Scottish Premier Division season was won by Celtic, three points ahead of Rangers. 

Severe winter conditions meant that many games had to be rescheduled, with clubs finishing their fixture lists at different times. When Dundee United finished their season they were three points ahead of Rangers and four in front of Celtic, but both Old Firm clubs had four games left to play. Celtic subsequently clinched the championship in their final match with a 4–2 Old Firm derby victory against Rangers; although Rangers still had two further matches still to play, the resulting 5-point gap could not be closed.

Heart of Midlothian and Motherwell were relegated.

Table

Results

Matches 1–18
During matches 1–18 each team plays every other team twice (home and away).

Matches 19–36
During matches 19–36 each team plays every other team twice (home and away).

References
1978–79 Scottish Premier Division – Statto

Scottish Premier Division seasons
1978–79 Scottish Football League
Scot